Azize Tanrıkulu (born February 9, 1986) is a Turkish taekwondo athlete, who competed in the Women's 57 kg class at the 2008 Summer Olympics held in Beijing, China and won the silver medal. She lost the final match against Lim Su-Jeong by 0-1. She is competing for the İstanbul Büyükşehir Belediyesi S.K. She studied at Akdeniz University.

She graduated from physical education and sports at Akdeniz University. Her brother, Bahri Tanrıkulu is Turkey National Team member in Taekwondo and Olympic silver medalist, and her sister-in-law is Tina Morgan, an Australian former Olympic taekwondo competitor.

References

External links
 

1986 births
Living people
Turkish female taekwondo practitioners
Olympic silver medalists for Turkey
Taekwondo practitioners at the 2008 Summer Olympics
Olympic taekwondo practitioners of Turkey
Olympic medalists in taekwondo
Akdeniz University alumni
Turkish female martial artists
Istanbul Büyükşehir Belediyespor athletes
Medalists at the 2008 Summer Olympics
Universiade medalists in taekwondo
Universiade gold medalists for Turkey
European Taekwondo Championships medalists
Medalists at the 2005 Summer Universiade
21st-century Turkish women